This is a list of notable Pakistani hip hop musicians. This list includes artists who have been important to the genre.

Bohemia
Imran Khan
Young Stunners
Ali Gul Pir
Young Desi
Adil Omar
Zack Knight

See also 
Pakistani music

References 

Pakistani hip hop
Hip hop
Pakistani